Kenneth "Ken" Henry Llewellyn Richards (29 January 1934 – 8 January 1972) was a Welsh rugby union and professional rugby league footballer who played in the 1960s. He played representative level rugby union (RU) for Wales, and at club level for Bedwas RFC, Cardiff RFC and Bridgend RFC, as a fly-half, i.e. number 10, and club level rugby league (RL) for Salford. Noted for his drop-goals, Ken Richards would often take penalties and conversions using the drop goal method rather than placing the ball, during September 1961 he scored a drop goal penalty against Doncaster from 55 yards (50 metres).

Background
Ken Richards born in Bridgend, Wales, he was a pupil at Bridgend Grammar School, and he died in Bridgend, Wales.

International honours
Ken Richards won caps for Wales (RU) while at Bridgend RFC in 1960 against South Africa, and in 1961 against England, Scotland, Ireland, and France.

References

External links
 Search for "Richards" at rugbyleagueproject.org
 Statistics at wru.wales (RU)
 Statistics at bedwasrfc.co.uk
 Search for "Kenneth Richards" at britishnewspaperarchive.co.uk
 Search for "Ken Richards" at britishnewspaperarchive.co.uk
 The greatest ever Bridgend XV
 Image "Wales 1961 - Wales 6 England 3 - Cardiff Arms Park - 21st January 1961" at rugbyrelics.com

1934 births
1972 deaths
Bedwas RFC players
Bridgend RFC players
Cardiff RFC players
Footballers who switched code
People educated at Ysgol Brynteg
Rugby league players from Bridgend
Rugby union fly-halves
Rugby union players from Bridgend
Salford Red Devils players
Wales international rugby union players
Welsh rugby league players
Welsh rugby union players